Prema Geethangal is a 1981 Indian Malayalam-language film, directed by Balachandra Menon. The film stars Ambika, Shanavas, Nedumudi Venu and Jose Prakash. The film's score was composed by Johnson.

Cast
 
Ambika as Geetha 
Shanavas as Ajith 
Nedumudi Venu 
Jose Prakash 
Sankaradi 
Alleppey Ashraf 
P. R. Menon

Soundtrack
The music was composed by Johnson. All songs became mega hits. At that time, these songs were the most requested by music lovers from All India Radio.  All these songs were the choices of Music troops (Gana Mela) artists.

References

External links
  
 

1981 films
1980s Malayalam-language films
Films directed by Balachandra Menon